Percy Edward Rowe (28 May 1889 – 5 December 1916), known as "Paddy Rowan", was an Australian rules footballer who played with Collingwood in the Victorian Football League.

Family
He married Louisa Marion Newby in 1915; and they had a son, Percy, born on 1 May 1916.

Boxing
Rowe, who boxed under the name of Paddy Rowan, was the Victorian amateur champion lightweight boxer, who turned professional in 1910. He was still boxing when in the First AIF.

Football
Although his real name was Percy Rowe he was known at Collingwood as Paddy Rowan, an alias that had originated from his boxing career. The reason for the name change was that he could not play for Collingwod in 1911 because he had already played with the South Bendigo Football Club that year.

In order to allow them to sign him up, the Collingwood club registered him under the assumed name of Paddy Rowan.

Coincidentally another individual, unrelated to Rowe/Rowan, but also named Percy Rowe (I896-1976) played 96 games for Collingwood during the 1920s; also, Rowan's son, also Percy Rowe, played a number of games with the Collingwood Second XVIII.

Rowan played in two losing Grand Finals, the first from the back pocket in his debut season; the other as a half forward flanker in 1915. Rowan, who was in training with the army while at Collingwood, had completed a 10 mile route march on the morning of the 1915 Grand Final but still took the field.
Paddy Rowan was one of the outstanding players of his time.I feel sure that had he been spared to return from the war, he would have gone down in football as one of the game's greatest exponents.There was no phase of it in which he did not excel.A strong, virile follower, he could, with equal effectiveness, play centre half-back or centre half-forward. Paddy possessed the determination and courage of two men.          (Former Collingwood teammate Dan Minogue, in 1937.)

Military
He enlisted in the First AIF in July 1915. He died from shrapnel wounds receive in action at the Battle of the Somme on 5 December 1916.

See also
 List of Victorian Football League players who died in active service

Footnotes

References

 World War I Service Record: Percy Edward Rowe (924), National Archives of Australia.
 Roll of Honour: Sergeant Percy Edward Rowe (924), Australian War Memorial.
 
 Boyles Football Photos: Paddy Rowan.
 Collingwood Forever: Paddy Rowan 1911-1915.
 Daley, Paul, Collingwood: A Love Story, Victory Books, (Carlton), 2011. 9780522858808 
 Holmesby, Russell and Main, Jim (2007). The Encyclopedia of AFL Footballers. 7th ed. Melbourne: Bas Publishing.
 The Football Season — Collingwood Team, The Leader, (Saturday, 18 May 1912), p.27.

1889 births
1916 deaths
Collingwood Football Club players
Australian military personnel killed in World War I
Australian rules footballers from Victoria (Australia)
South Bendigo Football Club players
Military personnel from Victoria (Australia)